Mobeytiheh-ye Seh (also Romanized as Mobeyţīḩeh-ye Seh and Mobeyţīḩeh-e Seh; also known as Mobaitihehé Seh Raykan, Mobeyţīḩeh, and Mobeyţīḩehe Seh Rāykān) is a village in Elhayi Rural District, in the Central District of Ahvaz County, Khuzestan Province, Iran. At the 2006 census, its population was 47, in 8 families.

References 

Populated places in Ahvaz County